Pierre Anga (1940 – 1988) was a Congolese army officer and rebel leader who was an opposition figure to Congolese President Denis Sassou-Nguesso. He formed part of the Military Committee of the Congolese Labour Party which for the period between 18 March 1977 to 3 April 1977 acted in place of the Presidency after Marien Ngouabi was assassinated. Anga was arrested in 1987 for allegedly participating in a coup d'état against the President; during this arrest several soldiers were killed. Shortly after this coup attempt fighting broke out in the North of the country between forces led by Anga (a supporter of Joachim Yhombi-Opango) and Government forces. He was killed by Congolese security forces. He is reported to have died in the jungle of Ikongono.

See also
List of people assassinated in Africa
List of heads of state of the Republic of the Congo

References

Republic of the Congo military personnel
Republic of the Congo rebels
1940 births
1988 deaths
Republic of the Congo prisoners and detainees
Prisoners and detainees of the Republic of the Congo
Deaths by firearm in the Republic of the Congo